Jacek Roman Wszoła (born 30 December 1956 in Warsaw, Poland) is a retired Polish high jumper best known for winning gold and silver medals at the 1976 and 1980 Summer Olympics respectively. Wszoła is also a one-time world record holder with the result of 2.35 metres.

Biography
With his father Roman being an athletics coach, Jacek Wszoła was close to the sport since a very young age. He, eventually, also gave it a try – initially training for the hurdles before switching to high jump.

Wszoła started competing in 1971 and by 1974, aged just 17, made his first national senior team for the 1974 European Championships in Rome finishing fifth. His first international title came a year later in Athens where he became the European Junior Champion.

Wszoła, then 19 years old, was a big surprise at the 1976 Summer Olympics in Montreal where, competing in heavy rain, he managed to win over the favourites. Incidentally, shortly before the Games his father-coach made him train on wet tartan to prepare him for such circumstances.

Following his success in the Olympic year, Wszoła won gold medals at the 1977 European Indoor Championships in San Sebastián and the 1977 Summer Universiade in Sofia. The following season was much less successful as he only managed seventh place at the 1978 European Indoor Championships in Milan and fourth at the 1978 European Championships in Prague.

In 1980, soon before the Olympics, Wszoła was back in form breaking the world record with 2.35 metres. At the Moscow Olympics, however, he only finished second behind the East German Gerd Wessig who also beat his world record by one centimetre. One month after the Olympics he got seriously injured at a domestic meet in Poznań tearing ligaments in his ankle which ruled him out of the sport for 18 months. Wszoła was never able to regain his old form.

After missing out the entire 1981 season, Wszoła made a comeback in 1982 competing at the 1982 European Championships in Athens where he got into a dispute with his own national federation. After the qualification round, it was noticed that he competed in shoes of a different manufacturer than was then the official sponsor of the Polish team. As Wszoła refused to compete in the shoes provided by his federation, he was not allowed to start in the final and was sent back home. For this dubious infringement Wszoła was disqualified for six months.

The following year was also not very successful with Wszoła finishing only 11th in his last Universiade in Edmonton and 13th in the inaugural World Championships in Helsinki. In 1984 Poland, under pressure from the Soviet Union, boycotted the Los Angeles Olympic Games instead sending its athletes to the alternative competition, the Friendship Games in Moscow. The competition took place in a pouring rain, and Wszoła, having witnessed one of the athletes breaking an arm, decided to fake an injury to avoid a real one.

His last major international outing was the 1987 European Indoor Championships where he only managed eleventh place. The following year, he failed to make the Polish team for the 1988 Summer Olympics. Wszoła finished his professional career in 1989 although he later competed in masters competitions, among others winning the M40 category at the 1997 European Masters Championships.

Personal life
His wife Krystyna was also an athlete. They have two children, Jacek and Anna.

International competitions

1Representing Europe
2Did not start in the final

References

1956 births
Living people
Polish male high jumpers
Athletes (track and field) at the 1976 Summer Olympics
Athletes (track and field) at the 1980 Summer Olympics
Olympic athletes of Poland
Olympic gold medalists for Poland
Olympic silver medalists for Poland
Athletes from Warsaw
World record setters in athletics (track and field)
World Athletics Championships athletes for Poland
Medalists at the 1980 Summer Olympics
Medalists at the 1976 Summer Olympics
Olympic gold medalists in athletics (track and field)
Olympic silver medalists in athletics (track and field)
Universiade medalists in athletics (track and field)
Universiade gold medalists for Poland
Medalists at the 1977 Summer Universiade